The World University Cycling Championship is a competition sponsored by the International University Sports Federation (FISU) and sanctioned by the Union Cycliste Internationale (UCI), which was first held in 1978 in Antwerp, Belgium. Before 1978 there were also World University Championships, but these were not sponsored by the International University Sports Federation.
The next edition will be held in Jelenia Gora, Poland in 2014. 
The championship last five days and could contain events in five cycling sports: road cycling (road race and time trial), track cycling, mountainbike (cross-country and marathon), BMX and Cyclo-Cross.

Competitions
As part of the Student World Championships:

 FISU World University Cycling Championships:

See also
 Cycling at the Summer Universiade

References

External links
 FISU

 
Cycling
UCI World Championships